Epsilon is the fifth studio album by Finnish power metal band Dreamtale. Released on The Secret Door record label on 11 May 2011 in Finland, with an earlier 20 April 2011 release in Japan, it reached number 39 on Suomen virallinen lista, The Official Finnish Charts.

Track listing 
"Firestorm" (4:30)	
"Angel of Light" (4:04)		
"Each Time I Die" (5:13)	
"Where Eternal Jesters Reign" (3:33)		
"Fly Away" (5:08)
"Reasons Revealed" (4:48)		
"Strangers' Ode" (5:58)	
"Mortal Games"	(3:46)
"Lady of a Thousand Lakes" (5:51)		
"March to Glory" (6:28)

Personnel 
Erkki Seppänen - vocals
Rami Keränen - guitar
Akseli Kaasalainen - keyboards
Seppo Kolehmainen - guitar
Petteri Rosenbom - drummer
Heikki Ahonen - bass

Dreamtale albums
2011 albums